Priti Rijal, (born December 25, 1991) is a nationally ranked Nepali professional tennis player. She was awarded the Tennis scholarship from Collin College, Texas, USA. She was appointed as a Brand Ambassador of Universal Access for Children Affected by Aids in Nepal (UCAAN), in 2010.

Early life
Priti Rijal was born in Biratnagar, Nepal. Her elder brother Utsav Rijal is also a professional lawn tennis player.

Tennis career
She started playing tennis from the age of 12. She has participated in many national and international tennis championships. She also coached at Eagle Fustar in Fremont, CA for several months. Currently, she is working as a agent for ACN, a Multi Level Marketing (MLM) company in Bay Area, San Francisco, USA.

Career statistics and awards

Singles: 5 finals

References

External links
NCT Athletics Roster

1991 births
Living people
Nepalese sportswomen